This is a list of the described species of the harvestman family Triaenonychidae. The data is taken from Joel Hallan's Biology Catalog.

Triaenonychinae
Triaenonychinae Sørensen, in L. Koch 1886

 Acumontia Loman, 1898
 Acumontia alluaudi (Roewer, 1914) — Madagascar
 Acumontia armata Loman, 1898 — Madagascar
 Acumontia capitata (Lawrence, 1959)
 Acumontia cowani Pocock, 1903 — Madagascar
 Acumontia draconensis Lawrence, 1939 — South Africa
 Acumontia echinata Pocock, 1903 — Madagascar
 Acumontia flavispinus (Lawrence, 1959)
 Acumontia hystrix (Lawrence, 1959)
 Acumontia lomani (Roewer, 1914) — Madagascar
 Acumontia lomani (Roewer, 1914) — Madagascar (preoccupied)
 Acumontia longipes Lawrence, 1959
 Acumontia majori Pocock, 1902
 Acumontia milloti (Lawrence, 1959)
 Acumontia natalensis Lawrence, 1931 — South Africa
 Acumontia pococki Roewer, 1914 — Madagascar
 Acumontia roberti Pocock, 1903 — Madagascar
 Acumontia roeweri Starega, 1992
 Acumontia rostrata Pocock, 1902 — Madagascar
 Acumontia soerenseni (Roewer, 1914) — Madagascar
 Acumontia spinifrons (Roewer, 1914) — Madagascar
 Acumontia venator (Roewer, 1931) — Madagascar

 Allonuncia Hickman, 1958
 Allonuncia grandis Hickman, 1958

 Amatola Lawrence, 1931
 Amatola armata (Lawrence, 1938) — South Africa
 Amatola dentifrons Lawrence, 1931 — South Africa
 Amatola durbanica (Lawrence, 1937) — South Africa
 Amatola maritima (Lawrence, 1937) — South Africa
 Amatola setifemur (Lawrence, 1931) — South Africa
 Amatola unidentata (Lawrence, 1937) — South Africa

 Ankaratrix Lawrence, 1959
 Ankaratrix cancrops Lawrence, 1959
 Ankaratrix illota Lawrence, 1959

 Ankylonuncia Hickman, 1958
 Ankylonuncia barrowensis Hickman, 1958
 Ankylonuncia fallax Hickman, 1958
 Ankylonuncia mestoni Hickman, 1958

 Antongila Roewer, 1931
 Antongila spinigera Roewer, 1931 — Madagascar

 Austromontia Lawrence, 1931
 Austromontia bidentata Lawrence, 1934 — South Africa
 Austromontia caledonica Lawrence, 1931 — South Africa
 Austromontia capensis Lawrence, 1931 — South Africa
 Austromontia formosa Lawrence, 1963
 Austromontia litoralis Lawrence, 1934 — South Africa
 Austromontia silvatica Lawrence, 1931 — South Africa

 Austronuncia Lawrence, 1931
 Austronuncia leleupi Lawrence, 1963
 Austronuncia spinipalpis Lawrence, 1931 — South Africa

 Bezavonia Roewer, 1949
 Bezavonia remyi Roewer, 1949 — Madagascar

 Biacumontia Lawrence, 1931
 Biacumontia cornuta Lawrence, 1931 — South Africa
 Biacumontia elata Kauri, 1961
 Biacumontia fissidens Lawrence, 1931 — South Africa
 Biacumontia maculata Lawrence, 1938 — South Africa
 Biacumontia paucidens Lawrence, 1931 — South Africa
 Biacumontia truncatidens Lawrence, 1931 — South Africa
 Biacumontia variegata Lawrence, 1934 — South Africa

 Brasiloctis Mello-Leitão, 1938
 Brasiloctis bucki Mello-Leitão, 1938 — Brazil

 Breviacantha Kauri, 1954
 Breviacantha gisleni Kauri, 1954

 Bryonuncia Hickman, 1958
 Bryonuncia distincta Hickman, 1958

 Callihamina Roewer, 1942
 Callihamina adelaidia Roewer, 1942 — South Australia

 Callihamus Roewer, 1931
 Callihamus badius Roewer, 1931 — Australia

 Calliuncus Roewer, 1931
 Calliuncus ephippiatus Roewer, 1931
 Calliuncus glaber Kauri, 1954
 Calliuncus labyrinthus Hunt, 1972
 Calliuncus odoratus Hickman, 1958
 Calliuncus vulsus Hickman, 1959

 Ceratomontia Roewer, 1915
 Ceratomontia annae Lawrence, 1934 — South Africa
 Ceratomontia argentina Canals, 1939 — Argentina, Brazil, Uruguay
 Ceratomontia brasiliana Maury, 1999
 Ceratomontia capensis Roewer, 1915 — South Africa
 Ceratomontia centralis Maury & Roig Alsina, 1985 — Argentina
 Ceratomontia cheliplus Roewer, 1931 — South Africa
 Ceratomontia fluvialis Lawrence, 1931 — South Africa
 Ceratomontia hewitti Lawrence, 1931 — South Africa
 Ceratomontia irregularis Lawrence, 1931 — South Africa
 Ceratomontia karooensis Lawrence, 1931 — South Africa
 Ceratomontia mendocina Maury & Roig Alsina, 1985 — Argentina
 Ceratomontia minor Lawrence, 1931 — South Africa
 Ceratomontia namaqua Lawrence, 1934 — South Africa
 Ceratomontia nasuta Lawrence, 1934 — South Africa
 Ceratomontia pusilla Lawrence, 1934 — South Africa
 Ceratomontia reticulata Lawrence, 1934 — South Africa
 Ceratomontia rumpiana Lawrence, 1937 — Natal
 Ceratomontia ruticola Lawrence, 1934 — South Africa
 Ceratomontia sanguinea Lawrence, 1934 — South Africa
 Ceratomontia setosa Lawrence, 1931 — South Africa
 Ceratomontia tabulae Lawrence, 1931 — South Africa
 Ceratomontia thornei Lawrence, 1934 — South Africa
 Ceratomontia werneri Roewer, 1931 — South Africa

 Cluniella Forster, 1955
 Cluniella distincta Forster, 1955
 Cluniella minuta Forster, 1955
 Cluniella ornata Forster, 1955

 Decarynella Fage, 1945
 Decarynella gracillipes Fage, 1945 — Madagascar

 Diaenobunus Roewer, 1914
 Diaenobunus armatus Roewer, 1914 — New Caledonia

 Diasia Sørensen, 1902
 Diasia araucana E. A. Maury, 1987 — Chile
 Diasia michaelseni Sørensen, 1902 — Chile, Argentina
 Diasia platnicki E. A. Maury, 1987 — Chile

 Equitius Simon, 1880
 Equitius doriae Simon, 1880 — New South Wales
 Equitius altus (Forster, 1955)
 Equitius formidabilis G. S. Hunt, 1985 — New South Wales
 Equitius manicatum (Roewer, 1920) — Queensland
 Equitius montanus G. S. Hunt, 1985 — New South Wales
 Equitius meyersi (Phillips & Grimmett, 1932) — New Zealand
 Equitius richardsae G. S. Hunt, 1985 — New South Wales
 Equitius rotundum (Forster, 1955)
 Equitius spinatus (Pocock, 1903) —New South Wales
 Equitius tambourineus (Roewer, 1920) — Queensland

 Graemontia Lawrence, 1931
 Graemontia bicornigera Lawrence, 1963
 Graemontia bifidens Lawrence, 1931 — South Africa
 Graemontia decorata Lawrence, 1938 — South Africa
 Graemontia dentichelis Lawrence, 1931 — South Africa
 Graemontia erecta Kauri, 1961
 Graemontia natalensis Lawrence, 1937 — Natal

 Gunvoria Kauri, 1961
 Gunvoria spatulata Kauri, 1961

 Hedwiga Roewer, 1931
 Hedwiga manubriata Roewer, 1931 — New Zealand

 Hendea Roewer, 1931
 Hendea hendei Roewer, 1931 — New Zealand
 Hendea aurora Forster, 1965
 Hendea bucculenta Forster, 1954
 Hendea coatesi Forster, 1965
 Hendea fiordensis Forster, 1954
 Hendea maini Forster, 1965
 Hendea maitaia Forster, 1954
 Hendea myersi Forster, 1954
 Hendea myersi myersi Forster, 1954
 Hendea myersi assimilis Forster, 1954
 Hendea myersi cavernicola Forster, 1954
 Hendea myersi ochrea Forster, 1954
 Hendea myersi roeweri Forster, 1954
 Hendea nelsonensis Forster, 1954
 Hendea oconnori Forster, 1954
 Hendea phillippsi Forster, 1954
 Hendea phillippsi phillippsi Forster, 1954
 Hendea phillippsi stiphra Forster, 1954
 Hendea spina Forster, 1965
 Hendea takaka Forster, 1965
 Hendea townsendi Forster, 1965

 Hendeola Forster, 1954
 Hendeola bullata Forster, 1954
 Hendeola bullata bullata Forster, 1954
 Hendeola bullata pterna Forster, 1954
 Hendeola woodwardi Forster, 1954

 Heteronuncia Roewer, 1920
 Heteronuncia robusta Roewer, 1920 — Queensland

 Hickmanoxyomma G. S. Hunt, 1990
 Hickmanoxyomma cavaticum (Hickman, 1958)
 Hickmanoxyomma clarkei G. S. Hunt, 1990 — Tasmania
 Hickmanoxyomma cristatum G. S. Hunt, 1990 — Tasmania
 Hickmanoxyomma eberhardi G. S. Hunt, 1990 — Tasmania
 Hickmanoxyomma gibbergunyar G. S. Hunt, 1990 — Tasmania
 Hickmanoxyomma goedei G. S. Hunt, 1990 — Tasmania
 Hickmanoxyomma tasmanicum (Roewer, 1915) — Tasmania

 Holonuncia Forster, 1955
 Holonuncia cavernicola Forster, 1955
 Holonuncia dewae G. S. Hunt, 1992 — New South Wales
 Holonuncia dispar G. S. Hunt, 1992 — New South Wales
 Holonuncia enigma G. S. Hunt, 1992 — New South Wales
 Holonuncia francesae G. S. Hunt, 1992 — New South Wales
 Holonuncia hamiltonsmithi G. S. Hunt, 1992 — Victoria
 Holonuncia kaputarensis G. S. Hunt, 1992 — New South Wales
 Holonuncia katoomba G. S. Hunt, 1992 — New South Wales
 Holonuncia recta G. S. Hunt, 1992 — Australian Capital Territory
 Holonuncia seriata (Roewer, 1914) — New South Wales
 Holonuncia sussa G. S. Hunt, 1992 — New South Wales
 Holonuncia tuberculata (Roewer, 1915) — New South Wales
 Holonuncia weejasperensis G. S. Hunt, 1992 — New South Wales

 Hovanuncia Lawrence, 1959
 Hovanuncia bidentata Lawrence, 1959
 Hovanuncia monticola Lawrence, 1959
 Hovanuncia pupilla (Lawrence, 1959)

 Ivohibea Lawrence, 1959
 Ivohibea cavernicola Lawrence, 1959

 Lawrencella Strand, 1932
 Lawrencella inermis (Lawrence, 1931) — South Africa

 Leionuncia Hickman, 1958
 Leionuncia levis Hickman, 1958

 Lispomontia Lawrence, 1937
 Lispomontia coxidens Lawrence, 1937 — Natal

 Lomanella Pocock, 1903
 Lomanella raniceps Pocock, 1903 — Tasmania
 Lomanella atrolutea Roewer, 1915 — Tasmania
 Lomanella alata G. S. Hunt & J. L. Hickman, 1993 — Tasmania
 Lomanella ambulatorio G. S. Hunt & J. L. Hickman, 1993 — New South Wales
 Lomanella balooki G. S. Hunt & J. L. Hickman, 1993 — Victoria
 Lomanella blacki G. S. Hunt & J. L. Hickman, 1993 — Victoria
 Lomanella browni G. S. Hunt & J. L. Hickman, 1993 — Tasmania
 Lomanella exigua Hickman, 1958
 Lomanella inermis (Roewer, 1931) — Tasmania
 Lomanella insolentia G. S. Hunt & J. L. Hickman, 1993 — New South Wales
 Lomanella kallista Forster, 1949 — Australia
 Lomanella parva Forster, 1955
 Lomanella peltonychium G. S. Hunt & J. L. Hickman, 1993 — Western Australia
 Lomanella promontorium G. S. Hunt & J. L. Hickman, 1993 — Victoria
 Lomanella quasiparva G. S. Hunt & J. L. Hickman, 1993 — Tasmania
 Lomanella revelata G. S. Hunt & J. L. Hickman, 1993 — New South Wales
 Lomanella thereseae G. S. Hunt & J. L. Hickman, 1993 — Tasmania
 Lomanella troglodytes G. S. Hunt & J. L. Hickman, 1993 — Tasmania
 Lomanella troglophilia G. S. Hunt & J. L. Hickman, 1993 — Tasmania

 Mensamontia Lawrence, 1931
 Mensamontia melanophora Lawrence, 1931 — South Africa
 Mensamontia morulifera Lawrence, 1931 — South Africa

 Metanuncia Roewer, 1914
 Metanuncia stewartia (Hogg, 1910) — Stewart Island, New Zealand

 Micromontia Lawrence, 1939
 Micromontia flava Lawrence, 1939 — South Africa

 Millomontia Lawrence, 1959
 Millomontia brevispina Lawrence, 1959
 Millomontia vadoni Lawrence, 1959

 Millotonyx Lawrence, 1959
 Millotonyx tenuipes Lawrence, 1959

 Monomontia Lawrence, 1931
 Monomontia aquilonaris Lawrence, 1963
 Monomontia aspera Lawrence, 1939 — South Africa
 Monomontia atra Lawrence, 1931 — South Africa
 Monomontia brincki Kauri, 1961
 Monomontia corticola Lawrence, 1938 — South Africa
 Monomontia cristiceps Lawrence, 1963
 Monomontia curvirostris Lawrence, 1938 — South Africa
 Monomontia flava Lawrence, 1933 — South Africa
 Monomontia granifrons Lawrence, 1938 — South Africa
 Monomontia intermedia Lawrence, 1938 — South Africa
 Monomontia krausi Kauri, 1961
 Monomontia lawrencei Kauri, 1950
 Monomontia montensis Lawrence, 1938 — South Africa
 Monomontia rattrayi Lawrence, 1931 — South Africa
 Monomontia rugosa Lawrence, 1937 — Natal
 Monomontia transvaalica Lawrence, 1963
 Monomontia versicolor Lawrence, 1963

 Nahuelonyx E. A. Maury, 1988
 Nahuelonyx nasutus (Ringuelet, 1959)

 Neonuncia Roewer, 1914
 Neonuncia blacki Forster, 1954
 Neonuncia campbelli Forster, 1954
 Neonuncia eastoni Forster, 1954
 Neonuncia enderbei (Hogg, 1910)
 Neonuncia opaca (Roewer, 1931) — New Zealand

 Notonuncia Hickman, 1958
 Notonuncia arvensis Hickman, 1958
 Notonuncia diversa Hickman, 1958
 Notonuncia obscura Hickman, 1958

 Nucina Hickman, 1958
 Nucina dispar Hickman, 1958
 Nucina silvestris Hickman, 1958

 Nuncia Loman, 1902
 Nuncia americana Roewer, 1961
 Nuncia arcuata Forster, 1954
 Nuncia arcuata arcuata Forster, 1954
 Nuncia arcuata aorangiensis Forster, 1954
 Nuncia sperata Loman, 1902 — New Zealand
 Nuncia chilensis (H. Soares, 1968) — Chile, Argentina
 Nuncia conjuncta Forster, 1954
 Nuncia conjuncta conjuncta Forster, 1954
 Nuncia conjuncta magnopercula Forster, 1954
 Nuncia conjuncta fiordensis Forster, 1954
 Nuncia constantia Forster, 1954
 Nuncia dentifera Forster, 1954
 Nuncia fatula Forster, 1954
 Nuncia grandis Forster, 1954
 Nuncia heteromorpha Forster, 1954
 Nuncia heteromorpha heteromorpha Forster, 1954
 Nuncia heteromorpha prolobula Forster, 1954
 Nuncia inopinata Forster, 1954
 Nuncia insulana Roewer, 1942
 Nuncia kershawi Forster, 1965
 Nuncia marchanti Forster, 1965
 Nuncia obesa Forster, 1954
 Nuncia obesa obesa Forster, 1954
 Nuncia obesa grimmetti Forster, 1954
 Nuncia obesa magna Forster, 1954
 Nuncia obesa rotunda Forster, 1954
 Nuncia oconnori Forster, 1954
 Nuncia oconnori oconnori Forster, 1954
 Nuncia oconnori conocula Forster, 1954
 Nuncia oconnori kopua Forster, 1954
 Nuncia ovata Roewer, 1914 — New Zealand
 Nuncia paucispinosa Forster, 1954
 Nuncia rostrata E. A. Maury, 1990 — Chile
 Nuncia spinulosa E. A. Maury, 1990 — Argentina
 Nuncia stabilis Forster, 1954
 Nuncia sulcata Forster, 1954
 Nuncia tamula Forster, 1954
 Nuncia tapanuiensis Forster, 1954
 Nuncia townsendi Forster, 1965
 Nuncia unifalculata Hickman, 1940
 Nuncia verrucosa E. A. Maury, 1990 — Chile, Argentina
 Nuncia vidua Forster, 1954
 Nuncia nigriflava (Loman, 1902)
 Nuncia nigriflava nigriflava (Loman, 1902)
 Nuncia nigriflava parvocula Forster, 1954
 Nuncia nigriflava parva 
 Nuncia nigriflava smithi 
 Nuncia elongata Forster, 1954
 Nuncia frustrata Forster, 1954
 Nuncia levis Forster, 1954
 Nuncia pallida Forster, 1954
 Nuncia planocula Forster, 1954
 Nuncia stewartia 
 Nuncia sublaevis (Pocock, 1903) — New Zealand
 Nuncia variegata 
 Nuncia tumidarta Forster, 1954
 Nuncia roeweri Forster, 1954
 Nuncia alpha Forster, 1954
 Nuncia contrita Forster, 1954

 Nunciella Roewer, 1929
 Nunciella aspersa (Pocock, 1903) — Australia
 Nunciella badia (Hickman, 1958)
 Nunciella cheliplus Roewer, 1931 — Australia
 Nunciella dentata (Hickman, 1958)
 Nunciella granulata Roewer, 1931 — New Zealand
 Nunciella kangarooensis Hunt, 1971
 Nunciella karriensis Kauri, 1954
 Nunciella montana Forster, 1955
 Nunciella parvula Roewer, 1931 — Australia
 Nunciella tasmaniensis Hickman, 1958
 Nunciella tuberculata Forster, 1949 — Victoria
 Nunciella woolcocki Forster, 1955

 Nuncioides Hickman, 1958
 Nuncioides dysmicus Hickman, 1958
 Nuncioides infrequens Hickman, 1958

 Odontonuncia Hickman, 1958
 Odontonuncia saltuensis Hickman, 1958

 Paramontia Lawrence, 1934
 Paramontia infinita Lawrence, 1934
 Paramontia lisposoma (Lawrence, 1931) — South Africa

 Paranuncia Roewer, 1914
 Paranuncia gigantea Roewer, 1914 — Tasmania
 Paranuncia ingens Roewer, 1931 — Australia

 Parattahia Roewer, 1914
 Parattahia usignata Roewer, 1914 — Tasmania

 Paulianyx Lawrence, 1959
 Paulianyx brevipes Lawrence, 1959
 Paulianyx ferruginea Lawrence, 1959

 Perthacantha Roewer, 1931
 Perthacantha jugata Roewer, 1931 — Australia

 Planimontia Kauri, 1961
 Planimontia goodnightorum Kauri, 1961

 Prasma Roewer, 1931
 Prasma crassipalpus (Roewer, 1931) — New Zealand
 Prasma sorenseni Forster, 1954
 Prasma tuberculata (Hogg, 1920) — New Zealand

 Prasmiola Forster, 1954
 Prasmiola unica Forster, 1954

 Promecostethus Enderlein, 1909
 Promecostethus unifalculatus Enderlein, 1909 — Crozet Island, Procession Island

 Psalenoba Roewer, 1931
 Psalenoba nunciaeformis Roewer, 1931 — New Zealand

 Rhynchobunus Hickman, 1958
 Rhynchobunus arrogans Hickman, 1958

 Roewerania Lawrence, 1934
 Roewerania guduana Kauri, 1961
 Roewerania lignicola Lawrence, 1934 — South Africa
 Roewerania montana Kauri, 1961
 Roewerania spinosa Lawrence, 1938 — South Africa

 Rostromontia Lawrence, 1931
 Rostromontia capensis Lawrence, 1931 — South Africa
 Rostromontia granulifera Lawrence, 1931 — South Africa
 Rostromontia truncata Lawrence, 1931 — South Africa

 Speleomontia Lawrence, 1931
 Speleomontia cavernicola Lawrence, 1931 — South Africa

 Stylonuncia Hickman, 1958
 Stylonuncia spinosa Hickman, 1958

 Tasmanonyx Hickman, 1958
 Tasmanonyx montanus Hickman, 1958

 Triaenomontia Roewer, 1914
 Triaenomontia hispida Roewer, 1914 — Madagascar
 Triaenomontia horrida Roewer, 1914 — Madagascar
 Triaenomontia nigra (Lawrence, 1959)

 Triaenonychoides H. Soares, 1968
 Triaenonychoides cekalovici H. Soares, 1968 — Chile
 Triaenonychoides breviops E. A. Maury, 1987 — Chile

 Triaenonyx Sørensen, in L. Koch 1886
 Triaenonyx arrogans H. Soares, 1968 — Chile
 Triaenonyx chilensis Sørensen, 1902 — Chile
 Triaenonyx corralensis Roewer, 1915 — Chile
 Triaenonyx dispersus Roewer, 1915 — Chile
 Triaenonyx parva Phillips & Grimmett, 1932 — New Zealand
 Triaenonyx rapax Sørensen, in L. Koch 1886 — Chile
 Triaenonyx valdiviensis Sørensen, 1902 — Chile, Argentina

 Triconobunus Roewer, 1914
 Triconobunus horridus Roewer, 1914 — New Caledonia

 Valdivionyx E. A. Maury, 1988
 Valdivionyx crassipes E. A. Maury, 1988 — Chile, Argentina

 Yatala Roewer, 1942
 Yatala hirsti Roewer, 1942 —  South Australia

 Conoculus Forster, 1949
 Conoculus asperus Forster, 1949 — Australia

 Yulella Lawrence, 1939
 Yulella natalensis (Lawrence, 1937) — Natal

 Fumontana Shear, 1977
 Fumontana deprehendor Shear, 1977 — North Carolina, Tennessee

 Picunchenops E. A. Maury, 1988
 Picunchenops spelaeus E. A. Maury, 1988 — cave, Argentina

 Adaeulum Roewer, 1914
 Adaeulum areolatum (Pocock, 1903) — South Africa
 Adaeulum bicolor Lawrence, 1931 — South Africa
 Adaeulum brevidentatum Lawrence, 1934 — South Africa
 Adaeulum coronatum Kauri, 1961
 Adaeulum coxidens Lawrence, 1931 — South Africa
 Adaeulum godfreyi Lawrence, 1931 — South Africa
 Adaeulum humifer Lawrence, 1963
 Adaeulum monticola Lawrence, 1939 — South Africa
 Adaeulum moruliferum Lawrence, 1938 — Natal
 Adaeulum robustum Lawrence, 1937 — Natal
 Adaeulum supervidens Lawrence, 1933 — South Africa
 Adaeulum warreni Lawrence, 1933 — South Africa

 Adaeum Karsch, 1880
 Adaeum capense (Roewer, 1914) — South Africa
 Adaeum asperatum Karsch, 1880 — South Africa
 Adaeum bilineatum Forster, 1943 — New Zealand
 Adaeum fairburni Forster, 1943 — New Zealand
 Adaeum granulosum Lawrence, 1931 — South Africa
 Adaeum hewitti Roewer, 1931 — South Africa
 Adaeum hoggi Forster, 1943 — New Zealand
 Adaeum latens Loman, 1898 — South Africa
 Adaeum obtectum Loman, 1898 — South Africa
 Adaeum spatulatum Lawrence, 1931 — South Africa
 Adaeum squamatum Lawrence, 1931 — South Africa

 Cryptadaeum Lawrence, 1931
 Cryptadaeum capense Lawrence, 1931 — South Africa

 Heteradaeum Lawrence, 1963
 Heteradaeum exiguum Lawrence, 1963

 Larifuga Loman, 1898
 Larifuga avus W. Starega, 1989 — Cape Province
 Larifuga calcarata Lawrence, 1931 — South Africa
 Larifuga capensis Lawrence, 1931 — South Africa
 Larifuga dentifer Lawrence, 1931 — South Africa
 Larifuga granulosa Lawrence, 1931 — South Africa
 Larifuga mantonae Lawrence, 1934 — South Africa
 Larifuga montana Lawrence, 1931 — South Africa
 Larifuga oneraria Kauri, 1961
 Larifuga rugosa (Guérin-Méneville, 1838) — South Africa
 Larifuga weberi Loman, 1898 — South Africa

 Larifugella Lawrence, 1933
 Larifugella afra Lawrence, 1933 — South Africa
 Larifugella longipalpis Lawrence, 1934 — South Africa
 Larifugella natalensis (Lawrence, 1931) — South Africa
 Larifugella valida Lawrence, 1963
 Larifugella zuluana Lawrence, 1937 — Zululand

 Micradaeum Lawrence, 1931
 Micradaeum rugosum Lawrence, 1931 — South Africa

 Montadaeum Lawrence, 1931
 Montadaeum purcelli Lawrence, 1931 — South Africa

 Paradaeum Lawrence, 1931
 Paradaeum rattrayi Lawrence, 1931 — South Africa

 Triregia Forster, 1948
 Triregia fairburni [see Forster 1954
 Triregia bilineata [see Forster 1954
 Triregia monstrosa Forster, 1948 — New Zealand

 Pyenganella Hickman, 1958
 Pyenganella striata Hickman, 1958

 Tasmanonuncia Hickman, 1958
 Tasmanonuncia segnis Hickman, 1958

 Thelbunus Hickman, 1958
 Thelbunus mirabilis Hickman, 1958

 Triaenobunus Sørensen, in L. Koch 1886
 Triaenobunus bicarinatus Sørensen, in L. Koch 1886 — Australia
 Triaenobunus armstrongi Forster, 1955
 Triaenobunus asper Hickman, 1958
 Triaenobunus cornutus Hickman, 1958
 Triaenobunus groomi Forster, 1955
 Triaenobunus hamiltoni Phillips & Grimmett, 1932 — New Zealand
 Triaenobunus inornatus Hickman, 1958
 Triaenobunus mestoni Hickman, 1958
 Triaenobunus minutus Forster, 1955
 Triaenobunus montanus Hickman, 1958
 Triaenobunus pescotti Forster, 1955
 Triaenobunus pilosus Hickman, 1958
 Triaenobunus woodwardi Forster, 1955
 Triaenobunus pectinatus Pocock, 1903 — Tasmania

 Dingupa Forster, 1952
 Dingupa glauerti Forster, 1952

 Algidia Hogg, 1920
 Algidia akaroa Roewer, 1931 — New Zealand
 Algidia chiltoni Roewer, 1931 — New Zealand
 Algidia hoggi 
 Algidia homerica Forster, 1954
 Algidia interrupta Forster, 1954
 Algidia marplesi Forster, 1954
 Algidia nigriflavum 
 Algidia viridata Forster, 1954

 Allobunus Hickman, 1958
 Allobunus distinctus Hickman, 1958

 Americobunus Muñoz-Cuevas, 1972
 Americobunus ringueleti Muñoz-Cuevas, 1972

 Araucanobunus Muñoz-Cuevas, 1973
 Araucanobunus juberthiei Munoz-Cuevas, 1973

 Cenefia Roewer, 1931
 Cenefia adaeiformis Roewer, 1931 — New Zealand
 Cenefia delli Forster, 1954
 Cenefia sorenseni Forster, 1954
 Cenefia westlandica Forster, 1954

 Chilobunus Hickman, 1958
 Chilobunus spinosus Hickman, 1958

 Chrestobunus Roewer, 1914
 Chrestobunus fuscus Hickman, 1958
 Chrestobunus inermis Roewer, 1914 — Tasmania
 Chrestobunus spinulatus Roewer, 1914 — Tasmania

 Dipristes Roewer, 1931
 Dipristes serripus Roewer, 1931 — Australia

 Eubunus Hickman, 1958
 Eubunus crypsidomus Hickman, 1958

 Glyptobunus Roewer, 1914
 Glyptobunus ornatus Hickman, 1958
 Glyptobunus signatus Roewer, 1914 — Tasmania

 Mestonia Hickman, 1958
 Mestonia acris Hickman, 1958
 Mestonia picra Hickman, 1958

 Miobunus Roewer, 1915
 Miobunus thoracicus Roewer, 1915 — Tasmania
 Miobunus forficula Hunt, 1995 — Tasmania
 Miobunus mainae Hunt, 1995 — Tasmania
 Miobunus johnhickmani Hunt, 1995 — Tasmania
 Miobunus levis Hickman, 1958 [placement?
 Miobunus parvus (Hickman, 1958) [placement?

 Muscicola Forster, 1954
 Muscicola picta Forster, 1954

 Phanerobunus Roewer, 1915
 Phanerobunus armatus Roewer, 1915 — Tasmania
 Phanerobunus asperrimus Hickman, 1958
 Phanerobunus hebes Hickman, 1958
 Phanerobunus saxatilis Hickman, 1958

 Phoxobunus Hickman, 1958
 Phoxobunus rostratus Hickman, 1958
 Phoxobunus tuberculatus Hickman, 1958

 Pristobunus Roewer, 1931
 Pristobunus hilus Forster, 1954
 Pristobunus acuminatus (Hogg, 1920) — New Zealand

Kaolinonychinae
Kaolinonychinae Suzuki, 1975

 Kaolinonychus Suzuki, 1975
 Kaolinonychus coreanus (Suzuki, 1966)
 Kaolinonychus coreanus coreanus Suzuki, 1966
 Kaolinonychus coreanus longipes Suzuki, 1966

 Mutsunonychus Suzuki, 1976
 Mutsunonychus fuscus Suzuki, 1976

Nippononychinae
Nippononychinae Suzuki, 1975

 Nippononychus Suzuki, 1975
 Nippononychus japonica (Miyosi, 1957)

 Metanippononychus Suzuki, 1975
 Metanippononychus tomishimai Suzuki, 1975
 Metanippononychus tomishimai tomishimai Suzuki, 1975
 Metanippononychus tomishimai awanus Suzuki, 1975
 Metanippononychus daisenensis Suzuki, 1975
 Metanippononychus iriei Suzuki, 1975
 Metanippononychus iriei iriei Suzuki, 1975
 Metanippononychus iriei yakuensis Suzuki, 1975
 Metanippononychus iyanus Suzuki, 1975

 Izunonychus Suzuki, 1975
 Izunonychus ohruii Suzuki, 1975

Paranonychinae
Paranonychinae Briggs, 1971

 Kainonychus Suzuki, 1975
 Kainonychus akamai (Suzuki, 1972)
 Kainonychus akamai akamai Suzuki, 1972
 Kainonychus akamai esoensis Suzuki, 1975

 Metanonychus Briggs, 1971
 Metanonychus idahoensis Briggs, 1971 — Idaho
 Metanonychus nigricans Briggs, 1971 — California
 Metanonychus nigricans nigricans Briggs, 1971
 Metanonychus nigricans oregonus Briggs, 1971 — Oregon
 Metanonychus setulus Briggs, 1971
 Metanonychus setulus setulus Briggs, 1971 — Oregon
 Metanonychus setulus mazamus Briggs, 1971 — Oregon
 Metanonychus setulus navarrus Briggs, 1971 — California
 Metanonychus setulus obrieni Briggs, 1971 — California
 Metanonychus setulus cascadus Briggs, 1971 — Oregon

 Paranonychus Briggs, 1971
 Paranonychus brunneus (Banks, 1893) — Washington
 Paranonychus concolor Briggs, 1971

Sclerobuninae
Sclerobuninae Dumitrescu, 1976

 Cyptobunus Banks, 1905
 Cyptobunus cavicolens Banks, 1905 — Montana
 Cyptobunus ungulatus Briggs, 1971
 Cyptobunus ungulatus ungulatus Briggs, 1971 — Nevada
 Cyptobunus ungulatus madhousensis Briggs, 1971 — Utah

 Sclerobunus Banks, 1893
 Sclerobunus nondimorphicus Briggs, 1971 — Washington
 Sclerobunus parvus Roewer, 1931 — Canada
 Sclerobunus robustus (Packard, 1877)
 Sclerobunus robustus robustus (Packard, 1877) — western U.S.
 Sclerobunus robustus idahoensis (Briggs, 1971) — Idaho
 Sclerobunus robustus glorietus (Briggs, 1971) — New Mexico

 Zuma Goodnight & Goodnight, 1942
 Zuma acuta Goodnight & Goodnight, 1942 — California
 Zuma tioga Briggs, 1971 — California

Sørensenellinae
Sørensenellinae Forster, 1954

 Karamea Forster, 1954
 Karamea lobata Forster, 1954
 Karamea lobata lobata Forster, 1954
 Karamea lobata aurea Forster, 1954
 Karamea lobata australis Forster, 1954
 Karamea tricerata Forster, 1954
 Karamea tuthilli Forster, 1954
 Karamea trailli Forster, 1954

 Sørensenella Pocock, 1903
 Sørensenella formosana (Roewer, 1931) — New Zealand
 Sørensenella bicornis Pocock, 1903 — New Zealand
 Sørensenella bicornis bicornis Pocock, 1903
 Sørensenella bicornis parva Forster, 1954
 Sørensenella bicornis waikanae Forster, 1954
 Sørensenella prehensor Pocock, 1903 — New Zealand
 Sørensenella prehensor prehensor Pocock, 1903
 Sørensenella prehensor nitida Forster, 1954
 Sørensenella prehensor obesa Forster, 1954
 Sørensenella rotara Phillips & Grimmett, 1932 — New Zealand

References
 Joel Hallan's Biology Catalog: Triaenonychidae

Triaenonychidae
Triaenonychidae